Fedotovo is the name of several  rural localities in Russia.

Ivanovo Oblast
As of 2010, two rural localities in Ivanovo Oblast bear this name:
Fedotovo, Puchezhsky District, Ivanovo Oblast, a village in Puchezhsky District
Fedotovo, Shuysky District, Ivanovo Oblast, a village in Shuysky District

Kaliningrad Oblast
As of 2010, one rural locality in Kaliningrad Oblast bears this name:
Fedotovo, Kaliningrad Oblast, a settlement under the administrative jurisdiction of   the town of district significance of Pravdinsk in Pravdinsky District

Kaluga Oblast
As of 2010, one rural locality in Kaluga Oblast bears this name:
Fedotovo, Kaluga Oblast, a selo in Borovsky District

Republic of Karelia
As of 2010, one rural locality in the Republic of Karelia bears this name:
Fedotovo, Republic of Karelia, a village in Medvezhyegorsky District

Kostroma Oblast
As of 2010, five rural localities in Kostroma Oblast bear this name:
Fedotovo, Tsentralnoye Settlement, Buysky District, Kostroma Oblast, two villages in Tsentralnoye Settlement of Buysky District
Fedotovo, Chukhlomsky District, Kostroma Oblast, a village in Nozhkinskoye Settlement of Chukhlomsky District
Fedotovo, Makaryevsky District, Kostroma Oblast, a village in Voznesenskoye Settlement of Makaryevsky District
Fedotovo, Susaninsky District, Kostroma Oblast, a village in Buyakovskoye Settlement of Susaninsky District

Moscow Oblast
As of 2010, four rural localities in Moscow Oblast bear this name:
Fedotovo, Dmitrovsky District, Moscow Oblast, a village in Gabovskoye Rural Settlement of Dmitrovsky District
Fedotovo, Orekhovo-Zuyevsky District, Moscow Oblast, a village in Belavinskoye Rural Settlement of Orekhovo-Zuyevsky District
Fedotovo, Ruzsky District, Moscow Oblast, a village in Dorokhovskoye Rural Settlement of Ruzsky District
Fedotovo, Taldomsky District, Moscow Oblast, a village in Guslevskoye Rural Settlement of Taldomsky District

Nizhny Novgorod Oblast
As of 2010, one rural locality in Nizhny Novgorod Oblast bears this name:
Fedotovo, Nizhny Novgorod Oblast, a village in Semenovsky Selsoviet of Urensky District

Oryol Oblast
As of 2010, one rural locality in Oryol Oblast bears this name:
Fedotovo, Oryol Oblast, a village in Apalkovsky Selsoviet of Kromskoy District

Perm Krai
As of 2010, three rural localities in Perm Krai bear this name:
Fedotovo, Beryozovsky District, Perm Krai, a village in Beryozovsky District
Fedotovo, Permsky District, Perm Krai, a village in Permsky District
Fedotovo, Yusvinsky District, Perm Krai, a village in Yusvinsky District

Pskov Oblast
As of 2010, two rural localities in Pskov Oblast bear this name:
Fedotovo, Novorzhevsky District, Pskov Oblast, a village in Novorzhevsky District
Fedotovo, Porkhovsky District, Pskov Oblast, a village in Porkhovsky District

Republic of Tatarstan
As of 2010, one rural locality in the Republic of Tatarstan bears this name:
Fedotovo, Republic of Tatarstan, a selo in Zainsky District

Tver Oblast
As of 2010, three rural localities in Tver Oblast bear this name:
Fedotovo, Rzhevsky District, Tver Oblast, a village in Rzhevsky District
Fedotovo, Toropetsky District, Tver Oblast, a village in Toropetsky District
Fedotovo, Vesyegonsky District, Tver Oblast, a village in Vesyegonsky District

Vladimir Oblast
As of 2010, two rural localities in Vladimir Oblast bear this name:
Fedotovo, Gus-Khrustalny District, Vladimir Oblast, a village in Gus-Khrustalny District
Fedotovo, Sobinsky District, Vladimir Oblast, a village in Sobinsky District

Vologda Oblast
As of 2010, six rural localities in Vologda Oblast bear this name:
Fedotovo, Belozersky District, Vologda Oblast, a village in Antushevsky Selsoviet of Belozersky District
Fedotovo, Kirillovsky District, Vologda Oblast, a village in Ferapontovsky Selsoviet of Kirillovsky District
Fedotovo, Sheksninsky District, Vologda Oblast, a village in Charomsky Selsoviet of Sheksninsky District
Fedotovo, Totemsky District, Vologda Oblast, a village in Matveyevsky Selsoviet of Totemsky District
Fedotovo, Borisovsky Selsoviet, Vologodsky District, Vologda Oblast, a village in Borisovsky Selsoviet of Vologodsky District
Fedotovo, Fedotovsky Selsoviet, Vologodsky District, Vologda Oblast, a settlement in Fedotovsky Selsoviet of Vologodsky District

Yaroslavl Oblast
As of 2010, three rural localities in Yaroslavl Oblast bear this name:
Fedotovo, Bolsheselsky District, Yaroslavl Oblast, a village in Markovsky Rural Okrug of Bolsheselsky District
Fedotovo, Lyubimsky District, Yaroslavl Oblast, a village in Kirillovsky Rural Okrug of Lyubimsky District
Fedotovo, Uglichsky District, Yaroslavl Oblast, a village in Pokrovsky Rural Okrug of Uglichsky District